General elections were held in Liberia in 1899. In the presidential election, incumbent William D. Coleman of the True Whig Party was re-elected for a second full term (his first, partial term was spent completing the term of President Joseph James Cheeseman who had died in office).

References

Liberia
1899 in Liberia
Elections in Liberia
One-party elections
Election and referendum articles with incomplete results